Ngiratkel Etpison (3 May 1925 – 1 August 1997) was a politician and businessman from Palau. Etpison was elected President in 1988 and served from 1989 until 1993, becoming the country’s first elected president to serve a full term in office.

Election 
He was elected the country's president in the 1988 elections, the final elections conducted under a plurality voting system, in which he received just 26% of the votes cast, defeating opponent Roman Tmetuchl by a margin of 31 votes. The near-tie led elections in Palau to be reformed, and after that they were conducted under majority voting, with a second round if no candidate received more than half of all votes cast. He served from 1 January 1989 to 1 January 1993.  He ran again in the 1992 elections, but attracted just 2,084 votes compared to rivals Johnson Toribiong with 3,188 votes and Kuniwo Nakamura with 3,125 votes.

Presidency
Ngiratkel Etpison was the first president that survived his entire presidency. (Haruo Remeliik was murdered and Lazarus Salii committed suicide by shooting, both while in office.)

While in office, Etpison proposed a request to the United States of America to grant Palau independence from its 43-year U.N. trusteeship. Because of the Palauan constitutional requirement of achieving a 75% majority vote, the initial proposal was overturned. This proposal would later develop into the Compact of Free Association, an agreement with the United States that would grant independence to the Republic of Palau. The Compact of Free Association was approved by the United States in 1994 under Kuniwo Nakamura after negotiating a 50-year stimulus plan to support Palau's founding of its new Republic in exchange for military assets in land.

Business work
Ngiratkel Etpison founded the NECO group of companies in 1945. He started by using a Japanese scrapped generator to make ice candy, later becoming one of the prominent businessmen of Palau. He started the first tourist and sightseeing business in the 1970s, and in 1984 opened Palau Pacific Resort, Palau's most luxurious beach resort.

He died on Aug 1, 1997 in California, United States. His daughter Mandy T. Etpison managing his museum and she is the current director of the museum.

References

1925 births
1997 deaths
People from Koror
Presidents of Palau